Jiang Yan (born 10 January 1989) is a Chinese rower. She competed in the women's quadruple sculls event at the 2016 Summer Olympics.

References

External links
 

1989 births
Living people
Chinese female rowers
Olympic rowers of China
Rowers at the 2016 Summer Olympics
Rowers at the 2020 Summer Olympics
Place of birth missing (living people)
World Rowing Championships medalists for China
Rowers at the 2018 Asian Games
Medalists at the 2018 Asian Games
Asian Games medalists in rowing
Asian Games gold medalists for China
Sportspeople from Qingdao
20th-century Chinese women
21st-century Chinese women